The following lists events that happened in 1971 in Libya.

Incumbents
Prime Minister: Muammar Gaddafi

Events
 1 September. Referendum on the creation of Federation of Arab Republics.

1971–72 Libyan Premier League

 
Years of the 20th century in Libya
Libya
Libya
1970s in Libya